Table View High School was founded in 1986 in Table View, near Cape Town,  and is a public dual-medium Afrikaans and English school that enrolls both boys and girls (co-educational). The school is financially assisted by the Western Cape Education Department and therefore, like most other schools in South Africa, it charges a school fee, as regulated by the South African Schools Act. The school's current principal as of 2018 is Ms. R Cummings.

Academics
The school performs well when it comes to academics. A 100% matric pass rate has been achieved for 11 years in a row (2000 to 2011) and again in 2018.

TVHS offers a variety of subjects.

In Grades 8 and 9 there are nine compulsory subjects:

 English (Home Language or First Additional Language)
 [Afrikaans] (Home Language or First Additional Language)
 Mathematics (FET)
 Life Orientation
 Natural Sciences
 Social Sciences (Geography & History)
 Economic and Management Sciences
 Technology 
 Creative Arts (Art and Drama)

Once pupils reach their senior phase (Grades 10 - 12) they are given a choice of subjects. 
Pupils take two languages, maths, Life Orientation and choose 3 subjects:

 Mathematics (Pure or Literacy)
 English Home Language
 Afrikaans First Additional Language
 Life Orientation
 Physical Sciences
 Life Sciences
 Geography
 History
 Hospitality Studies
 Business Studies
 Accounting
 Computer Applications Technology (CAT)
 Visual Art 
 Design

Sport
Sports offered at the school are, certain sports are only played during either the Summer or Winter Season:

Boys

 Rugby
 Cricket
 Hockey
 Tennis
 Squash
 Surfing
 Body Boarding
 Hockey 5s
 Touch Rugby
 First Aid
Chess

Girls

 Netball
 Hockey
 Soccer
 Tennis
 Squash
 Surfing
 Softball
 Body Boarding 
 Hockey 5s
 First Aid
Chess

Girls and boys both have the option of becoming cricket scorers.

Activities

Culture and service activities offered at the school include:

 "Viewsion" - school newspaper
 Choir
 Debating
 Public Speaking
 Olympiads
 Christian Action
 Audio-Visual
 Library Monitors
 Drama club (acting club)
 Photography 
 Interact (an affiliate of the Rotary)
Eco club
Catering
General knowledge

References

External links

Schools in Cape Town
1986 establishments in South Africa
Bilingual schools in South Africa
Educational institutions established in 1986